Tiati is a tribute name originating from a part of the Republic of Cameroon. Its name is also a region in Cameroon.

Tiati is a Dacian name.

Geography of Cameroon
places